Senate Bill 1752, more commonly known as the Military Justice Improvement Act (MJIA), was introduced by U.S. Senator Kirsten Gillibrand (D-N.Y.) in 2013 as an attempt to reform procedures for determinations to proceed to trial by court-martial for certain offenses under the Uniform Code of Military Justice and for other purposes. The focus of the bill is to address the way that sexual assault in the United States military is handled through the military justice system and the chain of command. The bill has been criticized as potentially leading to a decrease in sexual assault prosecutions and in the protections offered to alleged victims of sexual assault. A similar bill that keeps Commanders in charge has been championed by Senator Claire McCaskill, D-Missouri. 

Although Senator Gillibrand has been working (with bi-partisan support) to get this bill passed since 2014, it continues to be stalled in the Senate. In 2019, it was not even allowed on the floor to be debated.  As of July 2020, Gillibrand has stated they will offer this bill attached to the NDAA for 2021.

References 

United States military law